Fabiola quinqueferella is a species of Oecophoridae moth in the genus Fabiola. It was described by Walsingham in 1881. It is found in California.

References

Moths described in 1881
Oecophorinae